George Innes Donaldson (born 24 November 1954) is a retired Scottish professional football player who is best known for his time with Rangers and Heart of Midlothian.

Football career
Having already been involved in a pre-season tour of Germany two years earlier, Donaldson made his professional debut for Rangers aged 17 years and 315 days, in a League Cup match against Stenhousemuir at Ibrox Stadium on 4 October 1972. This proved to be his only appearance that season and after only featuring nine times the following season, Donaldson joined Heart of Midlothian on 18 May 1974 on a free transfer. However, Donaldson struggled to make an impact in Gorgie, playing only seventeen league and League Cup games before moving on to Dunfermline Athletic in 1976. After one season in Fife, where he scored his only career league goal, he again moved on to the play in the New Zealand National Soccer League for Dunedin City. Donaldson returned to Scotland in 1978, playing for Meadowbank Thistle and latterly Whitehill Welfare.

References

External links
 

1954 births
Living people
Footballers from Edinburgh
Scottish footballers
Association football midfielders
Rangers F.C. players
Heart of Midlothian F.C. players
Dunfermline Athletic F.C. players
Livingston F.C. players
Expatriate association footballers in New Zealand
Scottish expatriate footballers
Scottish Football League players